Anton Krivobokov (born 9 April 1994) is a Russian judoka.

He is the silver medallist of the 2014 Judo Grand Slam Baku in the +100 kg category.

References

External links
 
 

1993 births
Living people
Russian male judoka
21st-century Russian people